Estradiol 3-tetrahydropyranyl ether is a synthetic estrogen and estrogen ether which was never marketed. It has been reported to possess improved oral activity relative to estradiol. One study in animals found that it had 15 times the oral activity of estradiol.

See also
 List of estrogen esters § Ethers of steroidal estrogens

References

Abandoned drugs
Secondary alcohols
Estrogen ethers
Phenols
Prodrugs
Synthetic estrogens
Tetrahydropyrans